The Secret of Lost Creek is an American adventure television series that aired on the Disney Channel from February 1, 1992, until March 1, 1992.

Premise
Two siblings spend the summer at their grandparents' house where Jeannie finds clues to a buried treasure and Robert tries to find Bigfoot.

Cast
Shannen Doherty as Jeannie Fogle
Jody Montana as Travis Hathaway
Scott Bremner as Robert Fogle
Florence H. French as Adelaid Murchison
Ruth Hale as Augusta Murchison
Dabbs Greer as Henry Fogel
Marjorie Hilton as Hettie Fogel
Don Shanks as Charlie Little Elk
Christa Denton as Camie
Shawn Phelan as Russy
Darrin Wheaton as Hardy
Jesse Bennett as P.T. Butler

Episodes

References

External links
 
TV Guide

1992 American television series debuts
1992 American television series endings
1990s American children's television series
American children's adventure television series
English-language television shows
Disney Channel original programming